Howard George Hammell (May 6, 1896 – February 9, 1965) was a provincial politician from Alberta, Canada. He served as a member of the Legislative Assembly of Alberta from 1944 to 1955, sitting with the Social Credit caucus in government.

References

Alberta Social Credit Party MLAs
1965 deaths
1896 births
People from Carstairs, Alberta